Amphimallon arianae is a species of beetle in the Melolonthinae subfamily that is endemic to Greece.

References

Beetles described in 1879
arianae
Endemic fauna of Greece
Beetles of Europe